The Yturri–Edmunds Historic Site is an historic site in San Antonio, Texas. The house is listed on the National Register of Historic Places listings in Bexar County, Texas . The homestead and mill were designated a Recorded Texas Historic Landmark in 1966.

History
In the early 19th century during the era of Mexico's General Colonization Law, Manuel Yturri de Castillo was given a land grant on property once owned by Mission Concepcion. He was thought to have been born in Spain, but immigrated to Mexico. There he was employed by Spanish merchants who transferred him to San Antonio.  In 1821, he married Maria Josefa Rodriguez, whose family were among the first Canary Islanders  to arrive in the area in 1731. Upon his death, his property passed to his heirs. His granddaughter Ernestine Edmunds bequeathed the property in the historic site to the San Antonio Conservation Society (SACS), which took possession of it in 1961.

Historic site
The adobe-block house, which is thought to have been built by Yturri de Castillo 1840–1860, was listed on the National Register of Historic Places listings in Bexar County, Texas, in 1996. SACS began major restoration in 1964, which included repairs, rebuilding of the porch area, re-plastering, and complete interior restoration.

Also on the site is an operational grist mill thought to have existed when Yturri de Castillo bought the property.  Former Pioneer Flour Mills executive Ernst Schuchard and architect Marvin Eickenroht oversaw the complete restoration of the mill in 1964. An 1881 two-story carriage house originally on the Oge property was purchased by SACS in 1964, restored and moved to the Yturri–Edmunds site. A caliche and stone home built by Cristof Postert on South Flores was donated to SACS in 1984 and also moved to the Yturri–Edmunds site.

The site is operated as a museum by SACS, on a by-appointment basis, and admission fees apply. With a 2-week notice, visitors are able to see the mill in operation.

References

Houses in San Antonio
Historic house museums in Texas
History of San Antonio
Recorded Texas Historic Landmarks
National Register of Historic Places in San Antonio
Mexican-American culture in San Antonio
Mexican Texas
Houses on the National Register of Historic Places in Texas
Museums in San Antonio
Spanish-American culture in Texas